A Roaring Adventure is a 1925 American silent Western film directed by Clifford Smith and starring Jack Hoxie, Mary McAllister and Marin Sais.

Plot
As described in a review in a film magazine, Duffy Burns (Hoxie), easterner since college days, visits his father in the cattle country and learns that rustlers are depleting the stock. He obtains employment on his father's ranch without disclosing his identity, and falls in love with Gloria Carpenter (McAllister), daughter of one of the thieves. In league with him is Katherine Dodd (Sais), a widow he has befriended, and Gloria cannot understand their friendship. Duffy and a shriff's posse frustrate the thieves attempt to "clean up," Gloria's father reforms, and Duffy wins the affections of the young woman.

Cast

Preservation
With no prints of A Roaring Adventure located in any film archives, it is a lost film.

References

Bibliography
 Munden, Kenneth White. The American Film Institute Catalog of Motion Pictures Produced in the United States, Part 1. University of California Press, 1997.

External links
 

1925 films
1925 Western (genre) films
American black-and-white films
1920s English-language films
Films directed by Clifford Smith
Lost American films
Lost Western (genre) films
Silent American Western (genre) films
Universal Pictures films
1920s American films